Atlantilux nodospicula is a species of sea snail, a marine gastropod mollusk, in the family Costellariidae, the ribbed miters.

Distribution
This marine species occurs off the Philippines.

References

External links
 Cernohorsky W.O. (1970). New Mitridae and Volutomitridae. The Nautilus. 83(3): 95-104

Costellariidae